Horaiclavus anaimus is a species of sea snail, a marine gastropod mollusk in the family Horaiclavidae.

It was previously included within the family Turridae.

Description
The length of the shell attains 12 mm.

Distribution
This marine species occurs off New Caledonia.

References

 Fedosov, A.; Kantor, Y. (2008). Toxoglossan gastropods of the subfamily Crassispirinae (Turridae) lacking a radula, and a discussion of the status of the subfamily Zemaciinae. Journal of Molluscan Studies, 74(1), 27–35

External links
 

anaimus